Posterior may refer to:
 Posterior (anatomy), the end of an organism opposite to its head
 Buttocks, as a euphemism
 Posterior horn (disambiguation)
 Posterior probability, the conditional probability that is assigned when the relevant evidence is taken into account
 Posterior tense, a relative future tense